Obenbergerula is a genus of beetles in the family Buprestidae, the jewel beetles. They are native to the Philippines. These beetles reach well over a centimeter in length and are brightly colored, usually shades of iridescent green with large spots. Their coloration is thought to be mimetic, possibly in mimicry of jewel bugs.

Species include:

 Obenbergerula confusa Bellamy, 1991
 Obenbergerula horni (Hoscheck, 1931)
 Obenbergerula paradoxa (Hoscheck, 1931)

References

Buprestidae genera
Insects of the Philippines